Robert Emmet Davitt (12 December 1899 – 26 September 1981) was an Irish politician and medical practitioner. He was elected to Dáil Éireann as a Cumann na nGaedheal Teachta Dála (TD) for the Meath constituency at the 1933 general election. He did not contest the 1937 general election. He was a son of Michael Davitt.

See also
Families in the Oireachtas

References

1899 births
1981 deaths
Cumann na nGaedheal TDs
Fine Gael TDs
Members of the 8th Dáil
Politicians from County Meath